The Battle of Flushing was a naval battle of the Eighty Years' War, fought on April 17, 1573 near the city of Flushing, Netherlands. The Spanish fleet was led by Sancho d'Avila, the Dutch fleet by Lieven Keersmaker.

The Dutch fleet initially left Flushing, but returned when the Spanish fleet was hit by the city's cannons. Five Spanish ships were seized, but the remainder managed to reach the cities of Middelburg and Arnemuiden.

1573 in Europe
Flushing
Flushing 1573
Battles in Zeeland
Vlissingen
1573 in the Habsburg Netherlands
Eighty Years' War (1566–1609)